Ray Adams may refer to:
 Ray Adams (singer) (1931–2003), Norwegian singer
 Ray Adams (basketball) (1912–1992), American basketball player

See also
 Raymond Delacy Adams (1911–2008), American neurologist and neuropathologist
 Raymonn Adams (born 1978), American football running back and return specialist